Goniophyto is a genus of true flies in the family Sarcophagidae.

Species
G. boninensis Lopes, 1958
G. bryani Lopes, 1938
G. formosensis Townsend, 1927
G. honshuensis Rohdendorf, 1962
G. horii Kurahashi & Suenaga, 1994
G. shanghaiensis Deng, Chen & Fan, 2007
G. tibialis Hennig, 1941
G. unguicularis Hennig, 1941
G. yaeyamaensis Kano & Shinonaga, 1964

References 

Sarcophagidae
Schizophora genera
Taxa named by Charles Henry Tyler Townsend